A Halloween cake is a cake prepared with Halloween-themed decorations and symbols. It may be prepared using traditional Halloween colors such as black and orange, and may be decorated in many diverse manners with various themes. It may be a part of the Halloween decorations in households that celebrate the holiday.

Overview

Halloween cake is prepared with Halloween symbols and themes. It may be prepared with orange and black coloration in the cake and icing, because orange is a traditional color associated with Halloween, such as the color of pumpkins, which are used to create jack-o'-lanterns. Black is another traditional Halloween color, and black coloration may be used on graveyard-themed cakes, among others. Food coloring may be used in the icing to color it. Carrot cakes are sometimes prepared as Halloween cakes, per their orange coloration. They are sometimes prepared as a spice cake, as a chocolate cake, as a pudding cake, and as a cheesecake. Halloween cake may be prepared as a layer cake, and also as cake pops and cupcakes. It may be displayed as part of the Halloween decorations during the holiday. Candy corn may be used as a cake decoration, as well as candy pumpkins.

Themes
Halloween cakes may be prepared in the appearance of jack-o'-lanterns and pumpkins. Some themes for Halloween cakes include "boogers and slugs", which may be prepared using green tomato as the boogers, and a spider web cake prepared with frosting laid out resembling a spider web. Cakes decorated with graveyard themes are also prepared. Additional themes include a cake designed to resemble a human brain and cupcakes that resemble having bloody teeth emerging from atop them, among others.

Commercial varieties
Some companies mass-produce Halloween cakes, such as Hostess Brands, which manufactures Hostess CupCakes for Halloween named "Hostess Scarycakes." The cakes are prepared with orange-colored frosting and a black frosting stripe.

See also

 Christmas cake 
 Candy apple – sometimes served on Halloween and Guy Fawkes Night
 List of cakes

References

Further reading

 

Cakes
Halloween food